David Laurence Acfield (born 24 July 1947) is an English former first-class cricketer who was also a champion fencer.

Cricket career
He was part of the successful Essex County Cricket Club team of the late 1970s and early 1980s and formed a noted county spin partnership with Ray East. He was a right-arm off break bowler and right-handed tail-end batsman. He played for Cambridge University from 1966 to 1968 and Essex from 1966 to 1986. He also appeared for MCC in 1973–74 and 1974. He was awarded his Essex cap in 1970 and had his Essex benefit season in 1981.

He took 10 wickets in a match 4 times and 5 wickets in an innings 34 times. His best first-class figures, 8 for 55, came against Kent. Acfield was no batsman, failing to score a first-class fifty in 417 innings.  His best score, 42, came against Leicestershire. His lack of batting ability, and strong competition from the likes of Fred Titmus and John Emburey, tolled against his chances of Test selection, although he was on the 'long list' for inclusion in the English team that toured West Indies in 1973.

After retiring he remained in the game and served on the ECB's management committee.

Fencing career
Acfield was also an Olympic fencer, taking part in the 1968 and 1972 Games.

He represented England and won a gold medal in the team sabre at the 1970 British Commonwealth Games in Edinburgh.

Acfield was a four times British fencing champion, winning the sabre title at the British Fencing Championships for four years in a row, 1969–1972, during which period he was the leading sabre fencer in the country. He retired from fencing after the 1972 Olympics, preferring to devote himself to cricket as a professional, having previously retained his amateur status to protect his Olympic qualification.

Personal life
Acfield attended Brentwood School, and graduated in history from Christ's College, Cambridge. For many years, during his cricket career, he taught history and took nets in winter at Rainsford Comprehensive School, later renamed St Peter's College, Chelmsford.

After his retirement from athletics, Acfield served as an administrator for the England and Wales Cricket Board and later as the president of the Essex County Cricket Club.

References

1947 births
Living people
Essex cricketers
English cricketers
Marylebone Cricket Club cricketers
Cambridge University cricketers
British male fencers
People educated at Brentwood School, Essex
Alumni of Christ's College, Cambridge
Olympic fencers of Great Britain
Fencers at the 1968 Summer Olympics
Fencers at the 1972 Summer Olympics
Sportspeople from Chelmsford
Fencers at the 1970 British Commonwealth Games
Commonwealth Games medallists in fencing
Commonwealth Games gold medallists for England
Young England cricketers
Medallists at the 1970 British Commonwealth Games